The Imperial British Conservative Party was a farcical political party founded by The Wizard of New Zealand in 1974. It "stood for the traditions of British imperialism in the face of capitalism, globalisation and the distinct lack of culture in Christchurch, New Zealand." It was still operating in 1984, though news reports also referred to it as The Wizard Party.

Activity in Australia 

The Imperial British Conservative Party also had a presence in Australia, especially during the republican debate of the 1990s. One of its candidates, Cecil G. Murgatroyd, had run for parliament in several Australian federal elections, at each time standing against the Prime Minister (initially Bob Hawke). In official statements, Murgatroyd listed his occupation as "dole bludger". At other times, Murgatroyd stood under the banner of another New Zealand joke party, the McGillicuddy Serious Party.

In one Australian election in the 1980s, the party promised to dye the Speaker's wig a conservative blue.

References

External links
The Wizard's explanation of the IBC's aims and purpose

Australian fringe and underground culture
Defunct political parties in Australia
Defunct political parties in New Zealand
Joke political parties in New Zealand
Joke political parties in Australia
Political parties with year of establishment missing
Political parties with year of disestablishment missing